Sir Walter Reuben Preston (20 September 1875 – 6 July 1946) was a Conservative Party politician in the United Kingdom, serving as MP for the Mile End from 1918 to 1923, and Cheltenham from 1928 to his resignation in 1937.

Early life and education
Preston was son of Reuben Thomas Preston, of Hayes Court, Kent. The Preston family had co-founded the engineering company J. Stone & Co.  He was educated at Bedford School.

Politics
At the 1918 general election, he was elected as Member of Parliament (MP) for the Mile End constituency in the East End of London.  He lost the seat at the 1923 general election to the Labour Party candidate John Scurr.

He returned to Parliament at a by-election in September 1928 for the Cheltenham constituency, and held the seat until he resigned from the House of Commons in 1937. He was made a Knight Bachelor.

Engineering work
Involved in the family business, Walter Reuben Preston was an engineer, with 35 patents, some of which were obtained jointly with well-known locomotive engineers such as Richard Deeley.

Personal life
On 18 April 1900, Preston married Ella Margaret (born 7 September 1877, died 28 January 1963), daughter of Huson Morris, of Hayes, Kent. They had three sons, Kenneth Huson Preston, Bryan Wentworth Preston, and Francis Richard Walter Preston, all three devoted yachtsmen, the eldest and youngest at the Olympics. They lived at 77, St James's Court, Buckingham Gate, London S.W.1., and at Tetbury, Gloucestershire.

There are memorial inscriptions to both at Holy Trinity Church, Long Newnton, near Tetbury, Gloucestershire.

References

External links 

1875 births
1946 deaths
Knights Bachelor
People educated at Bedford School
Conservative Party (UK) MPs for English constituencies
UK MPs 1918–1922
UK MPs 1922–1923
UK MPs 1924–1929
UK MPs 1929–1931
UK MPs 1931–1935
UK MPs 1935–1945
Politics of Cheltenham